David Hubbard may refer to:

 David Hubbard (politician) (1792–1874), U.S. Representative from Alabama
 David Allan Hubbard (1928–1996), President of Fuller Theological Seminary and Old Testament scholar
 David A. Hubbard (born 1955), American football player, author and pastor
 David A. Hubbard, Jr, American speleobiologist and geologist